Franciscus Illenfeld (Slovak: František Illenfeld, Hungarian: Illenfeld Ferenc) of Olomouc was a famous Moravian founder of bells. He had worked in Košice and his workshop was one of the best foundries in the Kingdom of Hungary.

Franciscus Illenfeld is the author of the St. Urban Bell (cast it in 1557) which was installed in the St. Urban Tower in Košice, today Slovakia. Its weight was 7 tones. In 1966 the St. Urban Bell was destroyed by fire. It was renovated and located in the front of the tower. In 1996 a copy of the St. Urban Bell was cast in a mould and installed in the tower.

He is also the author of the St. John Bell that is exhibited at Zvonárska Street in Košice. The bell was founded in 1558.

Gallery

History of Košice
Bell foundries
People from Olomouc
Musical instrument manufacturing companies of the  Czech Republic